Kamnje is a settlement just north of Šentrupert in southeastern Slovenia. The area is part of the historical region of Lower Carniola. The Municipality of Šentrupert is now included in the Southeast Slovenia Statistical Region.

References

External links
Kamnje at Geopedia

Populated places in the Municipality of Šentrupert